John Boag may refer to:

 John Boag (footballer, born 1965) (1965–2006), Scottish football defender
 John Boag (footballer, born 1874) (1874–1954), Scottish football centre forward
 John Boag (writer) (1775–1863), Scottish evangelist, pastor, and lexicographer